Francisco Suárez de Villegas, O. Carm. (died 1664) was a Roman Catholic prelate who served as Titular Bishop of Memphis (1649–1664).

Biography
Francisco Suárez de Villegas was born in Lisbon, Portugal and ordained a priest in the Order of the Brothers of the Blessed Virgin Mary of Mount Carmel on 24 November 1611.
On 9 December 1649, he was appointed during the papacy of Pope Innocent X as Vicar Apostolic and Titular Bishop of Memphis.
On 21 December 1649, he was consecrated bishop by Giulio Roma, Bishop of Tivoli, with Onorato Onorati, Bishop of Urbania e Sant'Angelo in Vado, and Francesco Visconti, Bishop of Cremona, serving as co-consecrators. 
He served as Vicar Apostolic and Titular Bishop of Memphis until his death on 17 April 1664.

Episcopal succession
While bishop, he was the principal co-consecrator of:
Flaminio Marcellino, Bishop of Cesena (1655); 
Francesco de Estrada, Archbishop of Brindisi (1659); 
Attilio Pietrasanta, Bishop of Vigevano (1659); and
Lorenzo Díaz de Encinas, Bishop of Ugento (1659).

References

External links and additional sources
 (for Chronology of Bishops) 
 (for Chronology of Bishops) 

17th-century Roman Catholic titular bishops
Bishops appointed by Pope Innocent X
1664 deaths
Carmelite bishops
People from Lisbon